The Umbrella is a 1933 British comedy film directed by Redd Davis and starring Kay Hammond, Harold French and Victor Stanley. It was made as a quota quickie at Twickenham Studios.

Premise
After being released from prison, two incompetent crooks allow the umbrella with their stolen valuables stashed away in it to be carried off by someone else. A series of confusions ensue as they desperately try to recover the missing umbrella.

Cast
 Kay Hammond as Mabel  
 Harold French as Freddie Wallace  
 Victor Stanley as Victor Garnett  
 Dick Francis as Michael Frankenstein  
 Barbara Everest as Mrs. Wynne  
 Kathleen Tremaine as Mary Wynne  
 John Turnbull as Governor  
 Syd Crossley as Police Constable 
 Ernest Mainwaring

References

Bibliography
 Chibnall, Steve. Quota Quickies: The Birth of the British 'B' Film. British Film Institute, 2007.
 Low, Rachael. Filmmaking in 1930s Britain. George Allen & Unwin, 1985.
 Wood, Linda. British Films, 1927-1939. British Film Institute, 1986.

External links
 

1933 films
British comedy films
1933 comedy films
1930s English-language films
Films shot at Twickenham Film Studios
Quota quickies
Films directed by Redd Davis
Films set in London
British black-and-white films
1930s British films